Godfrey Quigley (4 May 1923 – 7 September 1994) was an Irish film, television and stage actor. He appeared in Stanley Kubrick's films A Clockwork Orange and Barry Lyndon.

Biography

Quigley was born in Jerusalem, Mandatory Palestine, where his father was serving as an officer in the British Army. The family returned to Ireland in the 1930s and, following military service in the Second World War, Quigley trained as an actor at the Abbey School of Acting.

In 1949, Quigley made his first film appearance, in Saints and Sinners. He appeared in two Stanley Kubrick films: first as the prison chaplain in A Clockwork Orange (1971), and then as Captain Grogan in Barry Lyndon (1975). In British television, he played a has-been gangster in the serial Big Breadwinner Hog (1969). His theatre roles include the Irishman in Tom Murphy's The Gigli Concert, for which he won the Harvey's Best Actor Award in 1984.

In the 1950s, Quigley co-founded the Globe Theatre Company, whose members included his wife, Genevieve Lyons. The company was disestablished in 1960. During the same period, he produced the radio soap opera The Kennedys of Castleross.

In 1983 Quigley appeared in the film Educating Rita.

Death

Quigley died in Dublin of Alzheimer's disease, aged 71.

Filmography

References

External links
 
 

1923 births
1994 deaths
20th-century Irish male actors
Deaths from Alzheimer's disease
Deaths from dementia in the Republic of Ireland
Irish male film actors
Irish radio producers
Irish male stage actors
Irish male television actors
Irish theatre directors
Irish male voice actors
Irish expatriates in Mandatory Palestine